The 2018 Chengdu Open was a men's tennis tournament played on outdoor hard courts. It was the 3rd edition of the Chengdu Open and part of the ATP World Tour 250 series of the 2018 ATP World Tour. It took place at the Sichuan International Tennis Center in Chengdu, China, from September 24 to 30.

Singles main-draw entrants

Seeds

 1 Rankings are as of September 17, 2018

Other entrants
The following players received wildcards into the singles main draw:
  Tseng Chun-hsin
  Wu Yibing
  Zhang Ze

The following players received entry from the qualifying draw:
  Ruben Bemelmans
  Prajnesh Gunneswaran
  Lloyd Harris
  Bernard Tomic

The following player received entry as a lucky loser:
  Félix Auger-Aliassime

Withdrawals
Before the tournament
  Kevin Anderson →replaced by  Tim Smyczek
  Pablo Carreño Busta →replaced by  Vasek Pospisil
  Márton Fucsovics →replaced by  Radu Albot
  Nicolás Jarry →replaced by  Evgeny Donskoy
  Leonardo Mayer →replaced by  Guido Pella
  John Millman →replaced by  Marcos Baghdatis
  Frances Tiafoe →replaced by  Taylor Fritz
  Zhang Ze →replaced by  Félix Auger-Aliassime

Retirements
   Mischa Zverev

Doubles main-draw entrants

Seeds

 1 Rankings are as of September 1, 2018

Other entrants 
The following pairs received wildcards into the doubles main draw:
  Gao Xin /  Te Rigele
  Gong Maoxin /  Zhang Ze

The following pairs received entry as alternates:
  Ruben Bemelmans /  Prajnesh Gunneswaran

Withdrawals 
Before the tournament
  Fabio Fognini (fatigue)

Champions

Singles 

  Bernard Tomic def.  Fabio Fognini, 6–1, 3–6, 7–6(9-7)

Doubles 

  Ivan Dodig /  Mate Pavić def.  Austin Krajicek /  Jeevan Nedunchezhiyan, 6–2, 6–4

External links 
Official website

Chengdu Open
Chengdu Open
Chengdu Open
Chengdu Open
Chengdu Open